The 1991–92 NBA season was the Pacers' 16th season in the National Basketball Association, and 25th season as a franchise. The Pacers struggled early into the season losing 9 of their first 13 games. After ten games, the team released Mike Sanders to free agency; Sanders would later on re-sign with his former team, the Cleveland Cavaliers. The Pacers continued to struggle with a 15–28 record near the end of January, and held a 19–29 record at the All-Star break. However, they won 25 of their final 39 games, finishing the season fourth in the Central Division with a mediocre 40–42 record.

Reggie Miller led the team in scoring with 20.7 points per game, while Chuck Person averaged 18.5 points, 5.3 rebounds and 4.7 assists per game, and Detlef Schrempf was named Sixth Man of the Year for the second consecutive season, averaging 17.3 points and 9.6 rebounds per game off the bench. In addition, Rik Smits provided the team with 13.8 points, 5.6 rebounds and 1.4 blocks per game, and Micheal Williams contributed 15.0 points, 8.2 assists and 2.9 steals per game, and was named to the NBA All-Defensive Second Team. Off the bench, Vern Fleming provided with 8.9 points and 3.2 assists per game, while George McCloud contributed 6.6 points per game, but only played 51 games due to a thumb injury, top draft pick Dale Davis averaged 6.2 points, 6.4 rebounds and 1.2 blocks per game, and LaSalle Thompson provided with 4.9 points and 4.8 rebounds per game.

In the Eastern Conference First Round of the playoffs, they faced the Boston Celtics for the second straight season, where they were swept in three straight games. Following the season, Person and Williams were both traded to the Minnesota Timberwolves.

Draft picks

Roster

Regular season

Season standings

y - clinched division title
x - clinched playoff spot

z - clinched division title
y - clinched division title
x - clinched playoff spot

Record vs. opponents

Game log

Regular season

|- align="center" bgcolor="#ffcccc"
| 1
| November 1, 1991
| Washington
| L 103–109
|
|
|
| Market Square Arena
| 0–1
|- align="center" bgcolor="#ccffcc"
| 2
| November 2, 1991
| Utah
| W 127–112
|
|
|
| Market Square Arena
| 1–1
|- align="center" bgcolor="#ccffcc"
| 3
| November 5, 1991
| @ Phoenix
| W 111–105
|
|
|
| Arizona Veterans Memorial Coliseum
| 2–1
|- align="center" bgcolor="#ffcccc"
| 4
| November 6, 1991
| @ Sacramento
| L 102–112
|
|
|
| ARCO Arena
| 2–2
|- align="center" bgcolor="#ffcccc"
| 5
| November 8, 1991
| @ Portland
| L 96–121
|
|
|
| Memorial Coliseum
| 2–3
|- align="center" bgcolor="#ffcccc"
| 6
| November 9, 1991
| @ Seattle
| L 111–118
|
|
|
| Seattle Center Coliseum
| 2–4
|- align="center" bgcolor="#ffcccc"
| 7
| November 11, 1991
| @ L.A. Clippers
| L 97–106
|
|
|
| Los Angeles Memorial Sports Arena
| 2–5
|- align="center" bgcolor="#ccffcc"
| 8
| November 13, 1991
| New York
| W 110–107
|
|
|
| Market Square Arena
| 3–5
|- align="center" bgcolor="#ffcccc"
| 9
| November 15, 1991
| Seattle
| L 108–124
|
|
|
| Market Square Arena
| 3–6
|- align="center" bgcolor="#ffcccc"
| 10
| November 16, 1991
| @ Cleveland
| L 117–127
|
|
|
| Richfield Coliseum
| 3–7
|- align="center" bgcolor="#ccffcc"
| 11
| November 18, 1991
| Detroit
| W 118–101
|
|
|
| Market Square Arena
| 4–7
|- align="center" bgcolor="#ffcccc"
| 12
| November 20, 1991
| @ Boston
| L 101–116
|
|
|
| Boston Garden
| 4–8
|- align="center" bgcolor="#ffcccc"
| 13
| November 22, 1991
| @ Charlotte
| L 110–112
|
|
|
| Charlotte Coliseum
| 4–9
|- align="center" bgcolor="#ccffcc"
| 14
| November 23, 1991
| Miami
| W 119–83
|
|
|
| Market Square Arena
| 5–9
|- align="center" bgcolor="#ffcccc"
| 15
| November 27, 1991
| @ Dallas
| L 106–113
|
|
|
| Reunion Arena
| 5–10
|- align="center" bgcolor="#ccffcc"
| 16
| November 29, 1991
| Houston
| W 141–121
|
|
|
| Market Square Arena
| 6–10
|- align="center" bgcolor="#ffcccc"
| 17
| November 30, 1991
| @ Milwaukee
| K 119–137
|
|
|
| Bradley Center
| 6–11

|- align="center" bgcolor="#ccffcc"
| 18
| December 3, 1991
| @ Detroit
| W 108–99
|
|
|
| The Palace of Auburn Hills
| 7–11
|- align="center" bgcolor="#ffcccc"
| 19
| December 4, 1991
| Phoenix
| L 108–114
|
|
|
| Market Square Arena
| 7–12
|- align="center" bgcolor="#ccffcc"
| 20
| December 6, 1991
| Milwaukee
| W 126–106
|
|
|
| Market Square Arena
| 8–12
|- align="center" bgcolor="#ffcccc"
| 21
| December 7, 1991
| Portland
| L 112–115
|
|
|
| Market Square Arena
| 8–13
|- align="center" bgcolor="#ccffcc"
| 22
| December 10, 1991
| San Antonio
| W 109–102
|
|
|
| Market Square Arena
| 9–13
|- align="center" bgcolor="#ccffcc"
| 23
| December 13, 1991
| Dallas
| W 124–108
|
|
|
| Market Square Arena
| 10–13
|- align="center" bgcolor="#ccffcc"
| 24
| December 14, 1991
| Denver
| W 129–108
|
|
|
| Market Square Arena
| 11–13
|- align="center" bgcolor="#ffcccc"
| 25
| December 17, 1991
| @ Atlanta
| L 113–117
|
|
|
| The Omni
| 11–14
|- align="center" bgcolor="#ffcccc"
| 26
| December 18, 1991
| @ Miami
| L 112–118 (OT)
|
|
|
| Miami Arena
| 11–15
|- align="center" bgcolor="#ccffcc"
| 27
| December 21, 1991
| New Jersey
| W 118–109 (OT)
|
|
|
| Market Square Arena
| 12–15
|- align="center" bgcolor="#ffcccc"
| 28
| December 26, 1991
| Philadelphia
| L 110–113
|
|
|
| Market Square Arena
| 12–16
|- align="center" bgcolor="#ffcccc"
| 29
| December 28, 1991
| @ New York
| L 106–115 (OT)
|
|
|
| Madison Square Garden
| 12–17
|- align="center" bgcolor="#ffcccc"
| 30
| December 30, 1991
| Chicago
| L 104–109
|
|
|
| Market Square Arena
| 12–18

|- align="center" bgcolor="#ccffcc"
| 31
| January 3, 1992
| @ L.A. Lakers
| W 114–87
|
|
|
| Great Western Forum
| 13–18
|- align="center" bgcolor="#ffcccc"
| 32
| January 4, 1992
| @ Golden State
| L 121–140
|
|
|
| Oakland-Alameda County Coliseum Arena
| 13–19
|- align="center" bgcolor="#ffcccc"
| 33
| January 6, 1992
| @ Utah
| L 108–124
|
|
|
| Delta Center
| 13–20
|- align="center" bgcolor="#ffcccc"
| 34
| January 8, 1992
| L.A. Clippers
| L 102–104
|
|
|
| Market Square Arena
| 13–21
|- align="center" bgcolor="#ccffcc"
| 35
| January 11, 1992
| Atlanta
| W 138–115
|
|
|
| Market Square Arena
| 14–21
|- align="center" bgcolor="#ffcccc"
| 36
| January 14, 1992
| @ Washington
| L 118–127 (2OT)
|
|
|
| Capital Centre
| 14–22
|- align="center" bgcolor="#ffcccc"
| 37
| January 15, 1992
| Detroit
| L 104–118
|
|
|
| Market Square Arena
| 14–23
|- align="center" bgcolor="#ffcccc"
| 38
| January 17, 1992
| Orlando
| L 120–127
|
|
|
| Market Square Arena
| 14–24
|- align="center" bgcolor="#ccffcc"
| 39
| January 18, 1992
| Miami
| W 127–103
|
|
|
| Market Square Arena
| 15–24
|- align="center" bgcolor="#ffcccc"
| 40
| January 20, 1992
| @ New York
| L 97–105
|
|
|
| Madison Square Garden
| 15–25
|- align="center" bgcolor="#ffcccc"
| 41
| January 22, 1992
| @ Cleveland
| L 115–119 (OT)
|
|
|
| Richfield Coliseum
| 15–26
|- align="center" bgcolor="#ffcccc"
| 42
| January 24, 1992
| Cleveland
| L 102–104
|
|
|
| Market Square Arena
| 15–27
|- align="center" bgcolor="#ffcccc"
| 43
| January 25, 1992
| @ Charlotte
| L 105–107
|
|
|
| Charlotte Coliseum
| 15–28
|- align="center" bgcolor="#ccffcc"
| 44
| January 29, 1992
| @ Philadelphia
| W 115–90
|
|
|
| The Spectrum
| 16–28
|- align="center" bgcolor="#ccffcc"
| 45
| January 31, 1992
| Atlanta
| W 115–106 (OT)
|
|
|
| Market Square Arena
| 17–28

|- align="center" bgcolor="#ccffcc"
| 46
| February 2, 1992
| @ Denver
| W 128–122
|
|
|
| Market Square Arena
| 18–28
|- align="center" bgcolor="#ffcccc"
| 47
| February 3, 1992
| @ Houston
| L 111–122
|
|
|
| The Summit
| 18–29
|- align="center" bgcolor="#ccffcc"
| 48
| February 6, 1992
| @ San Antonio
| W 117–106
|
|
|
| HemisFair Arena
| 19–29
|- align="center"
|colspan="9" bgcolor="#bbcaff"|All-Star Break
|- style="background:#cfc;"
|- bgcolor="#bbffbb"
|- align="center" bgcolor="#ccffcc"
| 49
| February 11, 1992
| @ Orlando
| W 100–98
|
|
|
| Orlando Arena
| 20–29
|- align="center" bgcolor="#ffcccc"
| 50
| February 12, 1992
| New York
| L 104–111
|
|
|
| Market Square Arena
| 20–30
|- align="center" bgcolor="#ccffcc"
| 51
| February 14, 1992
| Milwaukee
| W 107–100
|
|
|
| Market Square Arena
| 21–30
|- align="center" bgcolor="#ccffcc"
| 52
| February 15, 1992
| @ Minnesota
| W 117–101
|
|
|
| Target Center
| 22–30
|- align="center" bgcolor="#ccffcc"
| 53
| February 17, 1992
| Charlotte
| W 128–117
|
|
|
| Market Square Arena
| 23–30
|- align="center" bgcolor="#ccffcc"
| 54
| February 19, 1992
| Sacramento
| W 129–115
|
|
|
| Market Square Arena
| 24–30
|- align="center" bgcolor="#ffcccc"
| 55
| February 21, 1992
| @ New Jersey
| L 101–105
|
|
|
| Brendan Byrne Arena
| 24–31
|- align="center" bgcolor="#ccffcc"
| 56
| February 23, 1992
| Boston
| W 102–95
|
|
|
| Market Square Arena
| 25–31
|- align="center" bgcolor="#ffcccc"
| 57
| February 26, 1992
| @ Boston
| L 109–130
|
|
|
| Boston Garden
| 25–32
|- align="center" bgcolor="#ccffcc"
| 58
| February 28, 1992
| Orlando
| W 114–109
|
|
|
| Market Square Arena
| 26–32
|- align="center" bgcolor="#ffcccc"
| 59
| February 29, 1992
| @ Charlotte
| L 119–121
|
|
|
| Charlotte Coliseum
| 26–33

|- align="center" bgcolor="#ccffcc"
| 60
| March 3, 1992
| @ Chicago
| W 103–101
|
|
|
| Chicago Stadium
| 27–33
|- align="center" bgcolor="#ffcccc"
| 61
| March 4, 1992
| @ Detroit
| L 107–110 (OT)
|
|
|
| The Palace of Auburn Hills
| 27–34
|- align="center" bgcolor="#ccffcc"
| 62
| March 6, 1992
| @ Atlanta
| W 115–113 (OT)
|
|
|
| The Omni
| 28–34
|- align="center" bgcolor="#ccffcc"
| 63
| March 7, 1992
| Minnesota
| W 108–97
|
|
|
| Market Square Arena
| 29–34
|- align="center" bgcolor="#ccffcc"
| 64
| March 10, 1992
| Washington
| W 101–91
|
|
|
| Market Square Arena
| 30–34
|- align="center" bgcolor="#ffcccc"
| 65
| March 11, 1992
| @ Philadelphia
| L 93–111
|
|
|
| The Spectrum
| 30–35
|- align="center" bgcolor="#ffcccc"
| 66
| March 13, 1992
| @ Orlando
| L 97–98
|
|
|
| Orlando Arena
| 30–36
|- align="center" bgcolor="#ccffcc"
| 67
| March 16, 1992
| L.A. Lakers
| W 98–85
|
|
|
| Market Square Arena
| 31–36
|- align="center" bgcolor="#ccffcc"
| 68
| March 18, 1992
| @ Miami
| W 116–111 (OT)
|
|
|
| Miami Arena
| 32–36
|- align="center" bgcolor="#ccffcc"
| 69
| March 20, 1992
| Milwaukee
| W 102–97 (OT)
|
|
|
| Market Square Arena
| 33–36
|- align="center" bgcolor="#ccffcc"
| 70
| March 22, 1992
| Philadelphia
| W 108–100
|
|
|
| Market Square Arena
| 34–36
|- align="center" bgcolor="#ffcccc"
| 71
| March 24, 1992
| @ Cleveland
| L 113–128
|
|
|
| Richfield Coliseum
| 34–37
|- align="center" bgcolor="#ccffcc"
| 72
| March 25, 1992
| @ Washington
| W 131–109
|
|
|
| Capital Centre
| 35–37
|- align="center" bgcolor="#ffcccc"
| 73
| March 27, 1992
| Golden State
| L 117–125
|
|
|
| Market Square Arena
| 35–38

|- align="center" bgcolor="#ccffcc"
| 74
| April 1, 1992
| Atlanta
| W 137–117
|
|
|
| Market Square Arena
| 36–38
|- align="center" bgcolor="#ccffcc"
| 75
| April 3, 1992
| Boston
| W 101–97
|
|
|
| Market Square Arena
| 37–38
|- align="center" bgcolor="#ffcccc"
| 76
| April 5, 1992
| New Jersey
| L 120–128
|
|
|
| Market Square Arena
| 37–39
|- align="center" bgcolor="#ccffcc"
| 77
| April 8, 1992
| @ Milwaukee
| W 122–107
|
|
|
| Bradley Center
| 38–39
|- align="center" bgcolor="#ffcccc"
| 78
| April 10, 1992
| Chicago
| L 96–108
|
|
|
| Market Square Arena
| 38–40
|- align="center" bgcolor="#ffcccc"
| 79
| April 11, 1992
| @ Chicago
| L 106–108
|
|
|
| Chicago Stadium
| 38–41
|- align="center" bgcolor="#ccffcc"
| 80
| April 14, 1992
| Charlotte
| W 123–96
|
|
|
| Market Square Arena
| 39–41
|- align="center" bgcolor="#ccffcc"
| 81
| April 16, 1992
| @ New Jersey
| W 119–113
|
|
|
| Brendan Byrne Arena
| 40–41
|- align="center" bgcolor="#ffcccc"
| 82
| April 17, 1992
| Cleveland
| L 102–107
|
|
|
| Market Square Arena
| 40–42

Playoffs

|- align="center" bgcolor="#ffcccc"
| 1
| April 23, 1992
| @ Boston
| L 113–124
| Reggie Miller (29)
| Detlef Schrempf (11)
| Micheal Williams (6)
| Boston Garden14,890
| 0–1
|- align="center" bgcolor="#ffcccc"
| 2
| April 25, 1992
| @ Boston
| L 112–119 (OT)
| Chuck Person (32)
| LaSalle Thompson (9)
| Micheal Williams (7)
| Boston Garden14,890
| 0–2
|- align="center" bgcolor="#ffcccc"
| 3
| April 27, 1992
| Boston
| L 98–102
| Reggie Miller (32)
| Dale Davis (13)
| Micheal Williams (11)
| Market Square Arena16,530
| 0–3
|-

Player Statistics

Season

Playoffs

Player Statistics Citation:

Awards and records
 Detlef Schrempf, NBA Sixth Man of the Year Award
 Micheal Williams, NBA All-Defensive Second Team

Transactions

References

See also
 1991-92 NBA season

Indiana Pacers seasons
Pace
Pace
Indiana